Group F of UEFA Euro 2016 contained Portugal, Iceland, Austria, and Hungary. It is Iceland's first appearance at the finals. Matches were played from 14 to 22 June 2016.

Teams

Notes

Standings

In the round of 16,
The winner of Group F, Hungary, advanced to play the runner-up of Group E, Belgium.
The runner-up of Group F, Iceland, advanced to play the runner-up of Group B, England.
The third-placed team of Group F, Portugal, advanced as one of the four best third-placed teams to play the winner of Group D, Croatia.

Matches

Austria vs Hungary

Portugal vs Iceland
Iceland had the chance for an early breakthrough when Gylfi Sigurðsson had a sight of goal but could not break the deadlock by beating the Portuguese goalkeeper Rui Patrício. Portugal started to seize control as the half wore on, though, and Vieirinha gave Hannes Þór Halldórsson some problems with a shot from distance on 18 minutes. Shortly afterwards, they could attained the lead as Cristiano Ronaldo crossed for Nani, but his header was saved at point-blank range. Ronaldo, who made his 127th appearance for Portugal, equalling Luís Figo as his nation's most capped player of all time, then missed a headed chance before just failing to make an impact from a cross, which was delivered by Pepe. They did not have to wait much longer for the breakthrough. With just over half an hour played, André Gomes was able to get down the right after some tactical build-up play before laying a low cross for Nani, who converted from close range to give Portugal a 1-0 lead at the break.

After the restart, Iceland drew level on 50 minutes. Jóhann Berg Guðmundsson sent in a cross from the right that found its way to Birkir Bjarnason, who swept the ball past Patrício. Portugal looked to reassert their possession but were struggling to make things happen, as when Ronaldo produced a skillful flick to spark a move on 56 minutes but was ultimately crowded out as he tried to engineer space for a shot. Renato Sanches made his competitive debut (making him the youngest Portuguese to appear in an international competition, breaking a record held by Cristiano Ronaldo for 12 years), replacing João Moutinho for the final 19 minutes of a 1–1 draw. Nani came close to adding his second goal on 71 minutes when he headed just wide of goal from Raphaël Guerreiro's direct free kick. Moreover, Ronaldo also fired just over as Portugal broke away on the counter, with Iceland continuing to pursue an ill-advised handball appeal at the other end. On 85 minutes, as Portugal were increasing the pressure, Ronaldo was presented with a cross at the back post by Nani; but his header was gathered by Halldórsson at the second attempt. Patrício pushed a shot from Finnbogasson up into the air and away, but Iceland were increasingly forced to cling on as the match drew to a conclusion. But they survived two Ronaldo free kicks in succession, deep into injury time, to come away with a valuable point.

Iceland vs Hungary

Portugal vs Austria

Iceland vs Austria

Hungary vs Portugal

References

External links
UEFA Euro 2016 Group F

UEFA Euro 2016
Portugal at UEFA Euro 2016
Austria at UEFA Euro 2016
Hungary at UEFA Euro 2016
Iceland at UEFA Euro 2016